The Red River shiner (Notropis bairdi) is a species of ray-finned fish in the genus Notropis.

It is endemic to the United States, where it is found in the Red River in Arkansas, Oklahoma, and Texas.

References 

 Robert Jay Goldstein, Rodney W. Harper, Richard Edwards: American Aquarium Fishes. Texas A&M University Press 2000, p. 86
 

Red River shiner
Fish of the Eastern United States
Freshwater fish of the United States
Endemic fauna of Arkansas
Endemic fauna of Oklahoma
Endemic fauna of Texas
Red River of the South
Red River shiner
Red River shiner
Fauna of the Plains-Midwest (United States)